Amolops monticola is a species of frog in the family Ranidae, the "true frogs". It is found in the Northeast India, eastern Nepal, and western China (Tibet, Yunnan), although there is some uncertainty regarding the Chinese records. It probably also occurs in the intervening Bhutan. Common names mountain sucker frog, mountain stream frog, mountain torrent frog, and mountain cascade frog have been coined for it.

Description
As is characteristic for the Amolops monticola group, skin is smooth, dorsolateral folds are present, and the side of head is dark, with a light-colored upper lip stripe extending to the shoulder. The tympanum is distinct. The finger and toe tips bear discs. The toes are webbed. Males have paired vocal sac.

Habitat and conservation
Amolops monticola occur in shaded stream rapids, but occasionally also in ponds. This frog lays eggs in stone crevices along the edges of streams, and on aquatic plants. It is not considered threatened by the International Union for Conservation of Nature (IUCN).

References

monticola
Frogs of China
Frogs of India
Amphibians of Nepal
Amphibians described in 1871
Taxa named by John Anderson (zoologist)